"I Am Woman" is a song performed by American recording artist Jordin Sparks. The up-tempo song was written by Ali Pierre Gaschani, Dean Josiah and Ryan Tedder, who also produced the track. "I Am Woman" premiered online via AOL Music on May 5, 2011, and was later officially released in the United States on May 10, 2011. The song's lyrics contain a message towards female empowerment, which talks about different aspects of the lives of women.

"I Am Woman" received a positive reception from most music critics, who complimented its differences with any of Sparks' previous singles, as well as noting its similarities to the sounds of American R&B singer Beyoncé.

Background
"I Am Woman" premiered online via AOL Music on May 5, 2011. It was written by Ali Pierre, Dean Josiah and Ryan Tedder, who also produced the track. "I Am Woman" was made available for download on iTunes Stores worldwide on May 6, 2011, and later in the United States on May 10, 2011.

On speaking about the song, Sparks said "I Am Woman is a song about different aspects of the lives of women. It could be a mother, a performer, a woman working in a corporate space — it's all about what we go through as women and how our lives are so crazy. Walk a mile in my shoes, or in my stilettos, if you dare and see what happens. It's all about the strengths that a woman has: how we can multitask and carry so much, yet still always be on point when we need to be and on cue when we need to be. It's all about the amazingness of a woman."

Critical reception
Following its release, "I Am Woman" was well received by most music critics. Becky Bain of Idolator wrote "This somewhat experimental, hand-clapping, high energy woman-power track is the most bangin' thing we've heard from Jordin, well, maybe ever. It makes us want to strap on our stilettos and wobble-strut all over the dancefloor!." Nadine Cheung of AOL Radio Blog said the track shows a "new side" to Sparks, and added that she "sings with a feisty attitude, leaving her sweet disposition at the door." Jason Lipshutz of Billboard called it "empowering". James Dinh of MTV Newsroom wrote, "Sparks has taken to her music as a venue to rejoice in her coming-of-age growth and maturity".

Many critics also noted the song's similarities to the sounds of American R&B singer Beyoncé. A writer for WPLJ said "I Am Woman" "is a forceful dance track that's a female empowerment anthem very reminiscent of Beyoncé." Jarett Wieselman of New York Post, described the song as a "pre-teen version" of Beyoncé's "Run the World (Girls)" (2011). Gil Kaufman of MTV News called it a "Beyoncé-like R&B jam".

Chart performance
For the issue dated May 19, 2011, "I Am Woman" debuted on the US Billboard Hot 100 at number eighty-two with 33,000 downloads sold. As of September 2014, the video has not been released.

Live performances
On May 12, 2011, Sparks performed "I Am Woman" live for the first time on the tenth season of American Idol. She wore a silver metallic trench coat and black heels for the first half of the performance, and was accompanied by female back-up dancers. During the second half, Sparks removed the coat to reveal a black, body-skimming, dress, and the female dancers were replaced by male dancers. Sparks performed the song on Live With Regis and Kelly on June 14. "I Am Woman" was performed on the thirteenth season of Dancing with the Stars results show on November 8 by the women dancers of the show.

Track listing
Digital download
"I Am Woman" – 3:30

Charts

Radio and release history

References

2011 singles
Jordin Sparks songs
Songs with feminist themes
Songs written by Ryan Tedder
2011 songs
Jive Records singles
Song recordings produced by Ryan Tedder